Klopački Vrh (Cyrillic: Клопачки Врх) is a village in the City of Zenica, Bosnia and Herzegovina.

Demographics 
According to the 2013 census, its population was nil.

References

}

Populated places in Zenica